"Anna Molly" is the lead single from Incubus's sixth album, Light Grenades.  The single was released September 20, 2006, on the Sony Music Store almost a month before its scheduled release. However, it was soon withdrawn for unknown reasons.

The song debuted at #19 on the Billboard Modern Rock Tracks chart and reached the #1 spot after 10 weeks on the chart. It stayed at the top for 5 weeks.

The song makes use of a Marxophone, a type of fretless zither.  The song's title is a play on the word "anomaly", and a Billboard article says the song describes "a woman who may or may not exist in real life". There is an acoustic version that is also available through iTunes.

The song is included in the video games Guitar Hero: On Tour the Nintendo DS and Nintendo Wii edition of Shaun White Snowboarding as well as the documentary Warren Miller's Dynasty.

Music video
On September 26, 2006, the Oil Factory Inc. produced and filmed the music video for "Anna Molly" in Wilmington, California, and Jamie Thraves directed the video.

The music video for the single features a woman played by Sasha Wexler who is found at a park, presumably deceased, and shows how she is passed from an ambulance on a stretcher, into a Morgue, and finally on an autopsy table. Throughout the video, she is shown moving her fingers little by little, even as she is put in a freezer. At the end of the video, as a medical examiner is about to perform the autopsy, her fingers move again, accompanied by a stream of tears. As the doctor brings his saw to her head, she reaches up and grabs his wrist tightly. The final scene shows the saw spinning on the floor. There is no blood on it.

The story is loosely based on the 1955 Alfred Hitchcock Presents episode "Breakdown".

Track listing

UK Single
"Anna Molly" (Album Version) – 3:46
"Anna Molly" (Live at Edgefest 2006)
"Drive" (Live at Edgefest 2006)
"Love Hurts" (Acoustic)

Charts

Personnel

Incubus
Brandon Boyd - vocals
Mike Einziger - guitar
Chris Kilmore - marxophone, keyboards
Ben Kenney - bass
Jose Pasillas - drums

References

2006 songs
2006 singles
Incubus (band) songs
Song recordings produced by Brendan O'Brien (record producer)
Songs written by Ben Kenney
Songs written by Brandon Boyd
Songs written by Mike Einziger
Songs written by Chris Kilmore
Epic Records singles
Songs written by José Pasillas